The Polak model is a monetary approach to the balance of payment published by J. J. Polak in 1957. It seeks to model a small, open economy operating under fixed nominal exchange rate. Polak suggest explicit links between the monetary and external sectors. Polak results continue to form the theoretical bases on which the IMF Financial Programming are carried out.

The Polak Model is based on the following four equations:

In the model the following variables are seen as exogenous:

Real Output , Exports , other foreign currency inflows 
.

They have to be projected during the IMF Financial Programming exercise in order to set the desired levels for the target variables which are:

Level of International Reserves 
Inflation, of change in price for the domestic sector  and,
Credit extended to the private sector .

The model also assumes that sooner or later the market will clear meaning that demand and supply of money will equal, or:

See also
Mundell–Fleming model
Marshall–Lerner condition

References

Further reading
 Polak, J. J., (1957), Monetary Analysis of Income Formation and Payments Problems, IMF Staff Papers, 6, issue 1, p. 1-50.
Mohsin S. Khan and Peter J. Montiel, A Marriage between Fund and Bank Models? Reply to Polak,IMF Staff Papers, Vol. 37, No. 1 (Mar., 1990), pp. 187–191

Economics models
International macroeconomics
Open economy macroeconomics
Monetary economics